The End of the Road is a 1954 British drama film directed by Wolf Rilla and starring Finlay Currie, Duncan Lamont and Naomi Chance. It was produced by Group Three Films as a second feature with funding from the NFFC and distributed by British Lion. It was made at Beaconsfield Studios . The film's sets were designed by the art director Michael Stringer.

Plot
A veteran worker at the Jericho Works strongly resists when he has retirement forced upon him by his employers. He says he will retire when he is 90. All he has to show is a small clock as a retirement present which he places on the family mantelpiece.

Mick-Mack lives with his son and his wife, and their young son Barnaby ("Barny").

Mick-Mack takes a job as night watchman at the Jericho Works. Meanwhile his son is fired for being late to work. The works decide that only Mick-Mack can resolve the troubles they are having in the electroplating section.

Mick-Mack discovers it is drops of honey (from bees in the roof) which are ruining the process.

Cast
 Finlay Currie as Mick MacAulay, Old 'Mick-Mack'  
 Duncan Lamont as Barney his son  
 Naomi Chance as Molly his son's wife
 Edward Chapman as Works Manager  
 Hilda Fenemore as Madge the pub landlady 
 George Merritt as Timekeeper 
 Gordon Whiting as Young Kennie  
 David Hannaford as Wee Barny 
 Eugene Leahy as Old Worker 
 Edie Martin as Gloomy Gertie  
 Pauline Winter as Personnel Manager  
 Michael Bird as Builder 
 Anthony Kilshawe as Manager  
 Kenneth Henry as Labour Exchange Clerk  
 Herbert C. Walton as First Old Man  
 Claude Bonser as Second Old Man 
 Sam Kydd as First Postal Clerk  
 Hugh Munro as Second Postal Clerk 
 Bert Simms as Crane Driver 
 John Baker as Foreman  
 Ewen Solon as Policeman  
 Edward Malin as Nightwatchman

Critical reception
The film historians Steve Chibnall and Brian McFarlane note that The End of the Road was "rightly praised" at the time of its release by Kinematograph Weekly as "provocative and purposeful entertainment", and they add that it is "characterised by a real feeling for cramped working-class life and for the gap left when suddenly one is no longer required to be anywhere on a regular basis".

References

Bibliography
 Chibnall, Steve & McFarlane, Brian. The British 'B' Film. Palgrave Macmillan, 2009.

External links

1954 films
British drama films
1954 drama films
Films directed by Wolf Rilla
Films shot at Beaconsfield Studios
1950s English-language films
British black-and-white films
1950s British films